Prudence Bonham (born 1948) is an Australian former politician and marine biologist. She was a Hobart City Council Alderman from 1990 to 2002 and the Deputy Lord Mayor of Hobart from 1994 to 2002.

Bonham spent 26 years working as a marine biologist for CSIRO. She took part in various marine expeditions in the Australian region and the Antarctic.

Bonham was inducted into the Tasmanian Honour Roll of Women in 2013.

References 

Living people
1948 births
Australian women scientists
Women marine biologists
Politicians from Sydney
Women local councillors in Australia
Tasmanian local councillors